A biblical manuscript is any handwritten copy of a portion of the text of the Bible. Biblical manuscripts vary in size from tiny scrolls containing individual verses of the Jewish scriptures (see Tefillin) to huge polyglot codices (multi-lingual books) containing both the Hebrew Bible (Tanakh) and the New Testament, as well as extracanonical works.

The study of biblical manuscripts is important because handwritten copies of books can contain errors. Textual criticism attempts to reconstruct the original text of books, especially those published prior to the invention of the printing press.

Hebrew Bible (or Tanakh) manuscripts

The Aleppo Codex (c. 920 CE) and Leningrad Codex (c. 1008 CE) were once the oldest known manuscripts of the Tanakh in Hebrew. In 1947, the finding of the Dead Sea scrolls at Qumran pushed the manuscript history of the Tanakh back a millennium from such codices. Before this discovery, the earliest extant manuscripts of the Old Testament were in Greek, in manuscripts such as the Codex Vaticanus and Codex Sinaiticus. Out of the roughly 800 manuscripts found at Qumran, 220 are from the Tanakh. Every book of the Tanakh is represented except for the Book of Esther; however, most are fragmentary. Notably, there are two scrolls of the Book of Isaiah, one complete (1QIsa), and one around 75% complete (1QIsb). These manuscripts generally date between 150 BCE to 70 CE.

Extant Tanakh manuscripts

New Testament manuscripts

The New Testament has been preserved in more manuscripts than any other ancient work of literature, with over 5,800 complete or fragmented Greek manuscripts catalogued, 10,000 Latin manuscripts and 9,300 manuscripts in various other ancient languages including Syriac, Slavic, Gothic, Ethiopic, Coptic, Nubian, and Armenian. The dates of these manuscripts range from c. 125 (the  papyrus, oldest copy of John fragment) to the introduction of printing in Germany in the 15th century.

Often, especially in monasteries, a manuscript cache was little more than a former manuscript recycling centre, where imperfect and incomplete copies of manuscripts were stored while the monastery or scriptorium decided what to do with them. There were several options. The first was to simply "wash" the manuscript and reuse it. Such reused manuscripts were called palimpsests and were very common in the ancient world until the Middle Ages. One notable palimpsest is the Archimedes Palimpsest.  When washing was no longer an option, the second choice was burning. Since the manuscripts contained the words of Christ, they were thought to have had a level of sanctity; burning them was considered more reverent than simply throwing them into a garbage pit, which occasionally happened (as in the case of Oxyrhynchus 840). The third option was to leave them in what has become known as a manuscript gravesite. When scholars come across manuscript caches, such as at Saint Catherine's Monastery in the Sinai (the source of the Codex Sinaiticus), or Saint Sabbas Monastery outside Bethlehem, they are finding not libraries but storehouses of rejected texts sometimes kept in boxes or back shelves in libraries due to space constraints. The texts were unacceptable because of their scribal errors and contain corrections inside the lines, possibly evidence that monastery scribes compared them to a master text. In addition, texts thought to be complete and correct but that had deteriorated from heavy usage or had missing folios would also be placed in the caches. Once in a cache, insects and humidity would often contribute to the continued deterioration of the documents.

Complete and correctly-copied texts would usually be immediately placed in use and so wore out fairly quickly, which required frequent recopying. Manuscript copying was very costly when it required a scribe's attention for extended periods so a manuscript might be made only when it was commissioned. The size of the parchment, script used, any illustrations (thus raising the effective cost) and whether it was one book or a collection of several would be determined by the one commissioning the work. Stocking extra copies would likely have been considered wasteful and unnecessary since the form and the presentation of a manuscript were typically customized to the aesthetic tastes of the buyer.

Due to the prevalence of manuscript caches, scholars today are more likely to find incomplete and sometimes conflicting segments of manuscripts rather than complete and largely consistent works.

Transmission
The task of copying manuscripts was generally done by scribes who were trained professionals in the arts of writing and bookmaking. Scribes would work in difficult conditions, for up to 48 hours a week,  with little pay beyond room and board. Some manuscripts were also proofread, and scholars closely examining a text can sometimes find the original and corrections found in certain manuscripts. In the 6th century, a special room devoted to the practice of manuscript writing and illumination called the scriptorium came into use, typically inside medieval European monasteries. Sometimes a group of scribes would make copies at the same time as one individual read from the text.

Manuscript construction

An important issue with manuscripts is preservation. The earliest New Testament manuscripts were written on papyrus, made from a reed that grew abundantly in the Nile Delta. This tradition continued as late as the 8th century. Papyrus eventually becomes brittle and deteriorates with age. Beginning in the fourth century, parchment (also called vellum) began to be a common medium for New Testament manuscripts. It wasn't until the twelfth century that paper (made from cotton or plant fibers) began to gain popularity in biblical manuscripts.

Of the 476 non-Christian manuscripts dated to the second century, 97% of the manuscripts are in the form of scrolls; however, eight Christian manuscripts are codices. In fact, virtually all New Testament manuscripts are codices. The adaptation of the codex form in non-Christian text did not become dominant until the fourth and fifth centuries, showing a preference for that form amongst early Christians. The considerable length of some New Testament books (such as the Pauline epistles), and the New Testament itself, was not suited to the limited space available on a single scroll; in contrast a codex could be expanded to hundreds of pages.  On its own, however, length alone is an insufficient reason – after all, the Jewish scriptures would continue to be transmitted on scrolls for centuries to come. Scholars have argued that the codex was adopted as a product of the formation of the New Testament canon, allowing for specific collections of documents like the Gospels and the Pauline Epistles. "Canon and codex go hand in hand in the sense that the adoption of a fixed canon could be more easily controlled and promulgated when the codex was the means of gathering together originally separate compositions."

Script and other features

The handwriting found in New Testament manuscripts varies. One way of classifying handwriting is by formality: book-hand vs. cursive. More formal, literary Greek works were often written in a distinctive style of even, capital letters called book-hand. Less formal writing consisted of cursive letters which could be written quickly. Another way of dividing handwriting is between uncial script (or majuscule) and minuscule. The uncial letters were a consistent height between the baseline and the cap height, while the minuscule letters had ascenders and descenders that moved past the baseline and cap height. Generally speaking, the majuscules are earlier than the minuscules, with a dividing line roughly in the 11th century.

The earliest manuscripts had negligible punctuation and breathing marks. The manuscripts also lacked word spacing, so words, sentences, and paragraphs would be a continuous string of letters (scriptio continua), often with line breaks in the middle of words. Bookmaking was an expensive endeavor, and one way to reduce the number of pages used was to save space. Another method employed was to abbreviate frequent words, such as the nomina sacra. Yet another method involved the palimpsest, a manuscript which recycled an older manuscript. Scholars using careful examination can sometimes determine what was originally written on the material of a document before it was erased to make way for a new text (for example Codex Ephraemi Rescriptus and the Syriac Sinaiticus).

The original New Testament books did not have section headings or verse and chapter divisions. These were developed over the years as "helps for readers". The Eusebian Canons were an early system of division written in the margin of many manuscripts. The Eusebian Canons are a series of tables that grouped parallel stories among the gospels. Starting in the fifth century, subject headings (κεφαλαία) were used.

Manuscripts became more ornate over the centuries, which developed into a rich illuminated manuscript tradition, including the famous Irish Gospel Books, the Book of Kells and the Book of Durrow.

Cataloging

Desiderius Erasmus compiled the first published edition of the Greek New Testament in 1516, basing his work on several manuscripts because he did not have a single complete work and because each manuscript had small errors. In the 18th century, Johann Jakob Wettstein was one of the first biblical scholars to start cataloging biblical manuscripts. He divided the manuscripts based on the writing used (uncial, minuscule) or format (lectionaries) and based on content (Gospels, Pauline letters, Acts + General epistles, and Revelation). He assigned the uncials letters and minuscules and lectionaries numbers for each grouping of content, which resulted in manuscripts being assigned the same letter or number.

For manuscripts that contained the whole New Testament, such as Codex Alexandrinus (A) and Codex Ephraemi Rescriptus (C), the letters corresponded across content groupings. For significant early manuscripts such as Codex Vaticanus Graecus 1209 (B), which did not contain Revelation, the letter B was also assigned to a later 10th-century manuscript of Revelation, thus creating confusion. Constantin von Tischendorf found one of the earliest, nearly complete copies of the Bible, Codex Sinaiticus, over a century after Wettstein's cataloging system was introduced. Because he felt the manuscript was so important, Von Tischendorf assigned it the Hebrew letter aleph (א). Eventually enough uncials were found that all the letters in the Latin alphabet had been used, and scholars moved on to first the Greek alphabet, and eventually started reusing characters by adding a superscript. Confusion also existed in the minuscules, where up to seven different manuscripts could have the same number or a single manuscript of the complete New Testament could have 4 different numbers to describe the different content groupings.

Von Soden
Hermann von Soden published a complex cataloging system for manuscripts in 1902–10. He grouped the manuscripts based on content, assigning them a Greek prefix: δ for the complete New Testament, ε for the Gospels, and α for the remaining parts. This grouping was flawed because some manuscripts grouped in δ did not contain Revelation, and many manuscripts grouped in α contained either the general epistles or the Pauline epistles, but not both. After the Greek prefix, von Soden assigned a numeral that roughly corresponded to a date (for example δ1–δ49 were from before the 10th century, δ150–δ249 for the 11th century). This system proved to be problematic when manuscripts were re-dated, or when more manuscripts were discovered than the number of spaces allocated to a certain century.

Gregory–Aland
Caspar René Gregory published another cataloging system in 1908 in Die griechischen Handschriften des Neuen Testaments, which is the system still in use today. Gregory divided the manuscripts into four groupings: papyri, uncials, minuscules, and lectionaries. This division is partially arbitrary. The first grouping is based on the physical material (papyrus) used in the manuscripts. The second two divisions are based on script: uncial and minuscule. The last grouping is based on content: lectionary. Most of the papyrus manuscripts and the lectionaries before the year 1000 are written in uncial script. There is some consistency in that the majority of the papyri are very early because parchment began to replace papyrus in the 4th century (although the latest papyri date to the 8th century). Similarly, the majority of the uncials date to before the 11th century, and the majority of the minuscules to after.

Gregory assigned the papyri a prefix of P, often written in blackletter script, with a superscript numeral. The uncials were given a prefix of the number 0, and the established letters for the major manuscripts were retained for redundancy (e.g. Codex Claromontanus is assigned both 06 and D). The minuscules were given plain numbers, and the lectionaries were prefixed with l often written in script (ℓ). Kurt Aland continued Gregory's cataloging work through the 1950s and beyond. Because of this, the numbering system is often referred to as "Gregory-Aland numbers".

The majority of New Testament textual criticism deals with Greek manuscripts because the scholarly opinion is that the original books of the New Testament were written in Greek. The text of the New Testament is also found both translated in manuscripts of many different languages (called versions) and quoted in manuscripts of the writings of the Church Fathers. In the critical apparatus of the Novum Testamentum Graece, a series of abbreviations and prefixes designate different language versions (it for Old Latin, lowercase letters for individual Old Latin manuscripts, vg for Vulgate, lat for Latin, sys for Sinaitic Palimpsest, syc for Curetonian Gospels, syp for the Peshitta, co for Coptic, ac for Akhmimic, bo for Bohairic, sa for Sahidic, arm for Armenian, geo for Georgian, got for Gothic, aeth for Ethiopic, and slav for Old Church Slavonic).

Dating

The original manuscripts of the New Testament books are not known to have survived. The autographs are believed to have been lost or destroyed a long time ago. What survives are copies of the original. Generally speaking, these copies were made centuries after the originals from other copies rather than from the autograph. Paleography, a science of dating manuscripts by typological analysis of their scripts, is the most precise and objective means known for determining the age of a manuscript. Script groups belong typologically to their generation; and changes can be noted with great accuracy over relatively short periods of time. Dating of manuscript material by a radiocarbon dating test requires that a small part of the material be destroyed in the process. Both radiocarbon and paleographical dating only give a range of possible dates, and it is still debated just how narrow this range might be. Dates established by radiocarbon dating can present a range of 10 to over 100 years. Similarly, dates established by paleography can present a range of 25 to over 125 years.

Earliest extant manuscripts
The earliest manuscript of a New Testament text is a business-card-sized fragment from the Gospel of John, Rylands Library Papyrus P52, which may be as early as the first half of the 2nd century. The first complete copies of single New Testament books appear around 200, and the earliest complete copy of the New Testament, the Codex Sinaiticus, dates to the 4th century. The following table lists the earliest extant manuscript witnesses for the books of the New Testament.

Textual criticism

Palaeography is the study of ancient writing, and textual criticism is the study of manuscripts in order to reconstruct a probable original or initially copied text.

None of the original documents of the New Testament is known to scholars to be extant; and the existing manuscripts differ from one another. The textual critic seeks to ascertain from the divergent copies which form of the text should be regarded as most conforming to the original. The New Testament has been preserved in three major manuscript traditions: the 4th-century-CE Alexandrian text-type, the Western text-type, and the Byzantine text-type, which includes over 80% of all manuscripts, the majority comparatively very late in the tradition.

Since the mid-19th century, eclecticism, in which there is no a priori bias to a single manuscript, has been the dominant method of editing the Greek text of the New Testament. This is reflected in the Novum Testamentum Graece, which since 2014 corresponds to both the United Bible Society, 5th edition and Nestle-Aland, 28th edition. In textual criticism, eclecticism is the practice of examining a wide number of text witnesses and selecting the variant that seems best. The result of the process is a text with readings drawn from many witnesses. In a purely eclectic approach, no single witness is theoretically favored. Instead, the critic forms opinions about individual witnesses, relying on both external and internal evidence. Even so, the oldest manuscripts, being of the Alexandrian text-type, are the most favored in these two publications; and the critical text has an Alexandrian disposition. Most English translations of the New Testament made in the 20th Century were based on these copies.

Textual scholar Bart D. Ehrman writes: "It is true, of course, that the New Testament is abundantly attested in the manuscripts produced through the ages, but most of these manuscripts are many centuries removed from the originals, and none of them perfectly accurate. They all contain mistakes – altogether many thousands of mistakes. It is not an easy task to reconstruct the original words of the New Testament...." In reference to the textual evidence for the New Testament, Bruce M. Metzger wrote,

Biblical scholar Gary Habermas adds,

Every year, several New Testament manuscripts handwritten in the original Greek format are discovered. The latest substantial find was in 2008, when 47 new manuscripts were discovered in Albania; at least 17 of them unknown to Western scholars. There has been an estimate of 400,000 variations among all these manuscripts (from the 2nd to 15th century). If those 400,000 variations are spread over 5,600 manuscripts, the average manuscript has only about 71 variations, although some of these manuscripts are the equivalent of several hundred pages of text, hand-written (see Codex Vaticanus, Codex Alexandrinus, et al.).  The number of variants is additionally less significant than may appear since it is a comparison across linguistic boundaries.  More important estimates focus on comparing texts within languages. Those variations are considerably fewer. The vast majority of these are accidental errors made by scribes, and are easily identified as such: an omitted word, a duplicate line, a misspelling, a rearrangement of words. Some variations involve apparently intentional changes, which often make more difficult a determination of whether they were corrections from better exemplars, harmonizations between readings, or ideologically motivated. Variants are listed in critical editions of the text, the most important of which is the Novum Testamentum Graece, which is the basis for most modern translations. For over 250 years, Christian scholars have argued that no textual variant affects key Christian doctrine.

Listings
 List of New Testament papyri
 List of New Testament uncials
 List of New Testament minuscules
 List of New Testament lectionaries
 List of New Testament Latin manuscripts

Gallery

See also

 Ancient literature
 Apographa
 Dating the Bible
 Biblical criticism
 Textual criticism
 Categories of New Testament manuscripts
 Alexandrian text-type
 Byzantine text-type
 Caesarean text-type
 Western text-type
 List of major textual variants in the New Testament
 Higher criticism
 Manuscript culture
 Nag Hammadi library
 Fifty Bibles of Constantine
 List of Hebrew Bible manuscripts
 List of illuminated manuscripts

Notes

References

Bibliography

External links

 Center for the Study of New Testament Manuscripts
 Michael D. Marlowe's Bible Research site
 Micheal W. Palmer's Greek-Language.com Manuscripts page
 TextCrit.com: Eusebian Canon in Codex A
 Fragment of Psalms at the Heidelberger Papyrus-Sammlung
 
 Contantinus Siamakis, Oldest Manuscript of the Bible

Scribes
Textual scholarship